Partha Chatterjee (born 5 November 1947) is an Indian political scientist and anthropologist. He was the director of the Centre for Studies in Social Sciences, Calcutta from 1997 to 2007 and continues as an honorary professor of political science. He is also a professor of anthropology and South Asian studies at Columbia University and a member of the Subaltern Studies Collective.

Chatterjee received the Fukuoka Asian Culture Prize in 2009.

Education
He completed a BA (1967) and an M.A (1970) in political science from Presidency College, Calcutta and Calcutta University respectively. He completed his Ph.D. (1972) in international relations from the University of Rochester.

Career
He was the professor of political science and served as a director of the Centre for Studies in Social Sciences, Calcutta and is currently a professor (honorary) of the CSSSC and professor of anthropology and South Asian studies at Columbia University in New York. He was a founder-member of the Subaltern Studies Collective.

Publications
Books
1975. Arms, Alliances and Stability: The Development of the Structure of International Politics, Macmillan.
1986. Nationalist Thought and the Colonial World.  London: Zed Books.
1993. The Nation and its Fragments: Colonial and Postcolonial Histories. Princeton University Press.
1995. Texts of Power.  Minneapolis University of Minnesota Press.
1997. A Possible India.  New Delhi: Oxford University Press.
1997. The Present History of West Bengal.  New Delhi: Oxford University Press.
2003. A Princely Impostor? The Strange and Universal History of the Kumar of Bhawal. Princeton University Press.
2004. The Politics of the Governed: Popular Politics in Most of the World, Columbia University Press.
2010. Empire and Nation: Selected Essays 1985-2005, Columbia University Press.
2011. Lineages of Political Society: Studies in Postcolonial Democracy, Columbia University Press
2012. The Black Hole of Empire: History of a Global Practice of Power, Princeton University Press.

Other Publications

 1988. The Nationalist Resolution of the Women's Question. Centre for Studies in Social Sciences, Calcutta.

See also
 Vivek Chibber

References

External links 
 Biography of Partha Chatterjee on Columbia University's faculty page
 Member Profile, Committee on Global Thought at Columbia University
 The Two Hats of Partha Chatterjee: An Interview
 Partha Chatterjee: Colonialism, History and Civil Society
  Towards a Postcolonial Modernity - Asiasource Interview with Partha Chatterjee

1945 births
Bengali Hindus
20th-century Bengalis
21st-century Bengalis
Bengali historians
Bengali writers
Columbia University faculty
Indian institute directors
Postcolonialism
Living people
Scholars from Kolkata
University of Calcutta alumni
Academic staff of the University of Calcutta
Place of birth missing (living people)
University of Rochester alumni
West Bengal academics
Indian writers
Indian male writers
Indian historians
Indian anthropologists
Indian political scientists
Indian political writers
Indian scholars
Indian academics
20th-century Indian male writers
21st-century Indian male writers
20th-century Indian historians
21st-century Indian historians
20th-century Indian scholars
21st-century Indian scholars
20th-century Indian writers
21st-century Indian writers
People from West Bengal